Acer elegantulum is an uncommon Asian species of maple. It has been found only in eastern China (Anhui, Fujian, Guangxi, Guizhou, Hunan, Jiangxi, Zhejiang).

Acer elegantulum is a tree up to 15 meters tall. Leaves are non-compound, thin and papery, with 5 long tapering lobes.

References

External links
line drawing for Flora of China

elegantulum
Plants described in 1979
Flora of China